Keith Haynes may refer to:

 Keith E. Haynes (born 1963), American politician and lawyer, member of the Maryland House of Delegates
 Keith Haynes (musician) (born 1963), Welsh singer-songwriter and writer